Shri Ganganagar tehsil is one of the nine tehsils of Sri Ganganagar district. It is the northernmost of the tehsils. Sri Ganganagar city is the headquarters of the tehsil.

Its north border touches Fazilka district of Punjab. It is bordered in the east by Sadulshahar Tehsil, south by Padampur tehsil, west by Karanpur tehsil. It touches in north-west with Pakistani Punjab..
Chunawadh, Hindumalkot, Mirzawala are Sub Tehsils in Ganganagar Tehsil..
There are 53 Gram Panchayats under Ganganagar Tehsil

References

Sri Ganganagar district
Tehsils of Rajasthan